Bozorboy Burunov (Russian and Tajik: , formerly Yangibozor) is a jamoat in central Tajikistan. It is part of the city of Vahdat in Districts of Republican Subordination. The jamoat has a total population of 24,876 (2015).

References

Populated places in Districts of Republican Subordination